Savitri Dam, is a gravity dam on Savitri River near Poladpur, Raigad district in state of Maharashtra in India.

Specifications

Purpose
 Water supply

See also
 Dams in Maharashtra
 List of reservoirs and dams in India

References

Dams in Raigad district
Dams completed in 1999
1999 establishments in Maharashtra